In Euclidean geometry, trilinear polarity is  a certain correspondence between the points in the plane of a triangle not lying on the sides of the triangle and lines in the plane of the triangle not passing through the  vertices of the triangle. "Although it is called a polarity, it is not really a polarity at all, for poles of concurrent lines are not collinear points." It was Jean-Victor Poncelet (1788–1867), a French engineer and mathematician, who introduced the idea of the trilinear polar of a point in 1865.

Definitions

Let  be a plane triangle and let  be any point in the plane of the triangle not lying
on the sides of the triangle.

In detail, let the line  meet  the sidelines  at  respectively. Let the pairs of line  intersect at  respectively. By Desargues' theorem, the points  are collinear. The line of collinearity is the axis of perspectivity of triangle  and triangle . The line  is the trilinear polar of the point .

Poncelet used this idea to define the concept of trilinear polars.

If the line  is the trilinear polar of the point  with respect to the reference triangle  then  is called the trilinear pole of the line  with respect to the reference triangle .

Trilinear equation

Let the trilinear coordinates  of the point   be .

Construction of the trilinear pole

Let the line  meet the sides  of triangle  at  respectively.

Some trilinear polars

Some of the trilinear polars are well known.  

The trilinear polar of the centroid of triangle  is the line at infinity.
The trilinear polar of the symmedian point is the Lemoine axis of triangle .
The trilinear polar of the orthocenter is the orthic axis.
Trilinear polars are not defined for points coinciding with the vertices of triangle .

Poles of pencils of lines

Let  with trilinear coordinates  be the pole of a line passing through a fixed point  with trilinear coordinates . Equation of the line is 

Since this passes through ,

This is a circumconic of the triangle of reference . Thus the locus of the poles of a pencil of lines passing through a fixed point  is a circumconic  of the triangle of reference.

For example, the Trilinear polar of a point on the circumcircle must pass through its perspector, the Symmedian point X(6).

References

External links
Geometrikon page : Trilinear polars
Geometrikon page : Isotomic conjugate of a line

Triangle geometry